Farsian, Farseyan, and Farsiyan may refer to:
 Farsan, a city in Chaharmahal and Bakhtiari Province
 Farsian, Azadshahr, a village in Golestan Province
 Farsian, Galikash, a village in Golestan Province
 Farsian, Hamadan, a village in Hamadan Province
 Farzian, a village in Lorestan Province
 Farsian, Qazvin, a village in Qazvin Province
 Parsian (disambiguation)